Álvaro of Lencastre (1540–1626) was the son of Afonso of Lencastre, second son of infante George of Lencastre, 2nd Duke of Coimbra.

Disputed inheritance 

When George of Lencastre, 2nd Duke of Aveiro died, in 1578 in the Battle of Alcácer Quibir, together with King Sebastian I of Portugal and most Portuguese nobles, the Dukedom of Aveiro was claimed by two pretenders:
his daughter, Juliana of Lencastre (1560–1636);
his cousin, Álvaro of Lencastre (1540–1626), his closest male relative, son of Alphonse of Lencastre (Afonso de Lencastre), 2nd son of Infante George of Lencastre.

That was why Álvaro of Lencastre claimed his cousin's inheritance, to prevent the extinction of such a remarkable aristocratic House.

This dispute took about 2 decades, and finally, King Philip I of Portugal (also known as Philip II of Spain) decided that Dom Álvaro should marry his cousin, Dona Juliana, in order to inherit his family titles and estates, and they became jointly 3rd Dukes of Aveiro.

This marriage took place in 1598 and, for that occasion, the King granted the Dukes special honours:
Duke of Aveiro became a de juro e herdade title (which meant that the King was obliged to renew the title in its rightful heir);
the new title of Duke of Torres Novas was granted to the Duke of Aveiro’s heir;
the official Honorific style of Excellency, granted to the House of Braganza in 1579, was also granted to this House

The Ducal Palace was located in Azeitão, where, attached to the palace, they also built a hospital. They granted a huge protection to the Arrábida convent, founded by the 1st Duke, John of Lencastre, where they both are buried.

The couple had sixteen children:
George of Lencastre, 1st Duke of Torres Novas (1594–1632), died before his mother, so he never inherited the Dukedom of Aveiro, which passed to his older son;
Afonso of Lencastre (1597- ? ), Marquis of Porto Seguro, Marquis of Sardoal and 1st Duke of Abrantes (the last two as Spanish titles);
Madalena of Lencastre (1599- ? ), married to Dinis de Faro, 3rd Count of Faro;
Maria of Lencastre (1602- ? ), married to Manrique Silva, 1st Marquis of Gouveia;
Violante of Lencastre (1604- ? ), married to Lourenço Pires de Castro, 3rd Count of Basto;
Peter of Lencastre (1608–1673), Archbishop of Évora, who later became 5th Duke of Aveiro, after his nephew’s death;
Luís of Lencastre (1609–1673), married to Teresa Maria Saavedra, 4th Marchioness of Malagón, in Spain;
2 sons were priests;
4 daughters were nuns;
3 children died young.

Ancestors

See also
Infante George of Lencastre
Duke of Aveiro
Duke of Torres Novas
Marquis of Torres Novas

Notes

Bibliography

External links
Genealogy of Álvaro of Lencastre, 3rd Duke of Aveiro, in Portuguese
Genealogy of Juliana of Lencastre, 3rd Duchess of Aveiro, in Portuguese

102
103
Portuguese nobility
1540 births
1626 deaths